WKHX-FM (101.5 FM) is a commercial radio station licensed to Marietta, Georgia, featuring a country music format known as "New Country 101.Five". Owned by Cumulus Media, the station serves the Atlanta metropolitan area. WKHX-FM's studios are located in Sandy Springs, while the transmitter is located west of Emory University, in unincorporated DeKalb County. In addition to a standard analog transmission, WKHX-FM broadcasts over two HD Radio subchannels, and is available online.

History
101.5 signed on as WBIE-FM on November 11, 1959. under the ownership of Marietta Broadcasting. Initially, WBIE simulcast the variety programming of its sister station AM 1080 WBIE, but in February 1968 it adopted a full-time country music format. The station manager at the time, James M. Wilder, has a technology laboratory building named after him at Southern Polytechnic State University in Marietta.

Initially, WBIE-FM was powered at 3,500 watts, only heard in and around Marietta. In the 1970s, WBIE-FM boosted its power to the legal maximum of 100,000 watts, and became audible in Metro Atlanta.  Its AM companion at 1080 switched its format to Adult Standards and its call sign to WCOB.  The power boost made WBIE-FM a candidate to be bought by a large broadcasting company anxious for a strong FM signal in the growing Atlanta radio market.

"Kicks 101.5" debuted in November 1981 after Capital Cities Communications purchased WBIE-FM.  Capital Cities switched WBIE-FM's call letters to WKHX and made the station a contender in the Atlanta ratings.  In 1987, WKHX programming began to be simulcast on Capital Cities-owned AM 590, formerly known as WAGA and WPLO.  The AM station became WKHX, while 101.5 added an FM suffix, becoming WKHX-FM.  Today, AM 590 is Christian radio WDWD, owned by Salem Media.

Capital Cities took over ABC, including its television and radio stations, in 1985.  In 1995, ABC bought WKHX-FM's rival country station, WYAY.  Eventually, WYAY switched to news programming, and today is Christian Contemporary-formatted WAKL after being sold to the Educational Media Foundation in 2019.  In December 2006, WKHX-FM got a new country music competitor in WUBL, owned by Clear Channel Communications (now iHeartMedia).

WKHX-FM and other ABC Radio stations were acquired by Citadel Broadcasting in 2007, which was absorbed into Cumulus Media in September 2011.  In October 2011, WKHX-FM modified its playlist from playing only "new country" music to mixing in some older hits from the 1990s to the present.

On November 13, 2019, WKHX began running liners promoting a "big announcement" to come at 3 p.m. the following day. Several liners had a wolf-howling sound effect, a nod to rumors on radio news websites (based on web domains registered by Cumulus as far back as September) that the station was to rebrand as "The Wolf". At the promised time, the station rebranded, but instead as "New Country 101.Five", and also introducing a new morning show host, JJ Kincaid, to team with existing co-host Dallas McCade, with the show being branded as "Kincaid and Dallas".

Former logo

References

External links

HD Radio stations
KHX-FM
Cumulus Media radio stations
Radio stations established in 1968
Country radio stations in the United States
Former subsidiaries of The Walt Disney Company